The Schütte-Lanz D.III was a German fighter prototype during World War I. It participated in the first Idflieg D competition at Adlershof, Germany in January and February 1918. It was a conventional single-bay staggered biplane with N-type interplane struts. Of wooden construction with fabric skinning, the D.III revealed an unspectacular performance and production was never continued.

Variants
Dr.IThe Dr.I was a triplane using the fuselage, empennage, engine and undercarriage (apart from a slightly repositioned tailskid) of the D.III.  The new wings had a smaller span but had single bays and N-struts as before.  The centre wing was attached to the upper fuselage and the upper one supported over the cockpit on a N-strutted cabane.  Unusually, though there was stagger between the lower pair of wings, there was none between the upper two.  The Dr.I took part in the second D competition, held from 27 May to 28 June 1918.

Specifications

References

Bibliography 
 William Green and  Gordon Swanborough. The Complete Book of Fighters.  Colour Library Direct, Godalming, UK: 1994. .

Further reading

1910s German fighter aircraft
D.III
Aircraft first flown in 1918